The 1960 Michigan Wolverines football team was an American football team that represented the University of Michigan in the 1960 Big Ten Conference football season. In its second year under head coach Bump Elliott, Michigan compiled a 5–4 record (3–4 against conference opponents), finished in fifth place in the Big Ten, and outscored opponents by a combined total of 133 to 84.

Gerald Smith was the team captain and was selected by both the Associated Press and United Press International as the second-team center on the 1960 All-Big Ten Conference football team. Halfback Dennis Fitzgerald received the team's most valuable player award.

The team's statistical leaders included Dave Glinka with 755 passing yards, Bennie McRae with 342 rushing yards, Robert Johnson with 230 receiving yards, and Dave Raimey with 36 points scored.

Schedule

Season summary

Preseason
The 1959 Michigan Wolverines football team compiled a 4–5 in its first season under head coach Bump Elliott. Several players from the 1959 team were lost to graduation, including fullback and most valuable player Tony Rio, halfback Fred Julian, quarterback Stan Noskin, and 1959 team captain George Genyk.

In May 1960, end Bill Freehan received the team's Meyer Morton Award as the most improved player in the team's spring practice.

In June 1960, halfback Jack Strobel received the team's John Maulbetsch Award on the basis of "need, scholastic ability, together with a capacity, promise and desire for leadership and success."

Oregon

    
    
    

On September 24, Michigan opened its season with a 21–0 victory over Oregon. The game was played before a crowd of 50,889 at Michigan Stadium. On the opening drive, Michigan drove 53 yards for a touchdown. Sophomore halfback Dave Raimey ran 25 yards for the score on the first carry of his collegiate career. Sophomore quarterback Dave Glinka, also playing in his first collegiate game, threw touchdown passes of 10 yards to George Mans and nine yards to Scott Maentz. Michigan out-gained the Webfoots by a total of 377 yards to 135. Mans caught four passes for 65 yards and, playing on defense as well, recovered an Oregon fumble. Ken Tureaud led the Wolverines with 58 rushing yards.

Michigan State

    
    
    
    
    
    
    

On October 1, Michigan lost its annual rivalry game with Michigan State, 24–17, before a record-setting crowd of 76,490 at Spartan Stadium in East Lansing, Michigan. Michigan held a 17–14 lead at halftime. The highlight of the first half was a 99-yard kickoff return by Michigan halfback Dennis Fitzgerald. In a game that saw seven changes in the lead, Michigan State fullback Carl Charon scored the game-winning touchdown on a three-yard run with less than three minutes remaining in the game. In the Detroit Free Press, Lyall Smith called it one of the most sensational matches in the history of the rivalry: "It had everything. It had more than everything. It was one of collegiate football's greatest days and, if you don't believe it, wait about 20 years from now. They'll still be talking about it."

Duke

    
    
    
    
    
    

On October 8, Michigan defeated Duke, 31–6, before a crowd of 77,183 at Michigan Stadium. Sophomore halfback Dave Raimey rushed for 114 yards and two touchdowns. Dennis Fitzgerald also scored twice on a one-yard run and five-yard pass reception.

Northwestern

    
    
    

On October 15, Michigan defeated Northwestern, 14–7, before a crowd of 64,514 at Michigan Stadium. Michigan took a 6–0 lead in the second quarter on a 35-yard touchdown pass from Dave Glinka to Bob Johnson, but John Halsted's extra-point kick went wide. Early in the fourth quarter, Dave Raimey fumbled a punt at the Wolverines' 27-yard line. On fourth-and-two, Northwestern took the lead on a 19-yard pitchout and run by Al Kimbrough.  Glinka then completed a 50-yard pass to Johnson at the one-yard line. The pass was nearly intercepted by two Northwestern defenders, but the ball was bumped from the defenders into Johnson's hands. Fullback Bill Tunnicliff then ran the remaining yard for the game-winning touchdown, and Glinka passed to Bennie McRae for a two-point conversion. After the game, Northwestern coach Ara Parseghian credited Michigan's line: "Michigan's line is much better than we expected and much faster than last year."

Minnesota

    
    

On October 22, Michigan lost to Minnesota by a 10–0 score in the annual Little Brown Jug game before a crowd of 69,352 at Michigan Stadium. Michigan turned the ball over seven times on five fumbles and two interceptions. Jim Rogers scored all 10 points for Minnesota on a two-yard run, an extra point, and a field goal. After the game, Minnesota players carried coach Murray Warmath off the field.

Wisconsin

    
    
    
    
    

On October 29, Michigan lost to Wisconsin, 16–13, before a crowd of 57,629 at Camp Randall Stadium in Madison, Wisconsin. Michigan halfback Dave Raimey scored two rushing touchdowns in the first half to give Michigan a 13–6 lead at halftime. Jim Bakken kicked a game-winning 19-yard field goal with less than two minutes remaining in the game.

Illinois

    
    

On November 5, Michigan defeated Illinois, 8–7, before a crowd of 62,927 at Michigan Stadium. The game matched brothers Bump Elliott and Pete Elliott, head coaches of the Wolverines and Illini. Illinois took a 7–0 lead on a four-yard pass from Johnny Easterbrook to Marshall Starks. In the second quarter, Michigan gambled on a fake punt on fourth-and-seven; Dave Glinka took the snap on the fake and threw for a 17-yard gain to Bob Johnson at Illinois' 26-yard line. The Wolverines' then drove to the one-yard line with Bill Tunnicliff scoring on a one-yard run. Glinka then passed to Fitzgerald for a two-point conversion, giving Michigan its winning margin of one point. Neither team scored in the second half.

Indiana

    
    
    
    
    

On November 12, Michigan defeated Indiana, 29–7, before a crowd of 51,936 at Michigan Stadium. Indiana, which had beaten Michigan in the prior two meetings, drove 85 yards on its opening possession, capped by a 58-yard run by Mike Lopa. Michigan took the lead in the second quarter on a 31-yard pass from Dave Glinka to Scott Maentz. The score was 8–7 at halftime, but Michigan held Indiana to only seven yards in the second half. Michigan scored three touchdowns in the second half on runs by Bill Tunnicliff, Ken Tureaud, and John Kowalik. Two of Michigan's second-half touchdowns were aided by Indiana fumbles inside its 20-yard line. Bennie McRae led Michigan's backs with 87 rushing yards. Substituting extensively, Michigan used 56 players in the game. Michigan's leading scorer Dave Raimey did not play due to an ankle injury.

The Indiana game did not count in the Big Ten standings as a penalty for Indiana's violation of recruiting rules. After the game, Indiana coach Phil Dickens commented on the talent disparity between the teams: "You don't go bear hunting with a switch."

Ohio State

    

On November 19, Michigan defeated Ohio State, 7–0, before a crowd of 83,107 at Ohio Stadium in Columbus, Ohio. The game was scoreless through three quarters. Early in the fourth quarter, Ohio State fullback Bob Ferguson ran 17 yards for the game-winning touchdown. Michigan's defense held the Buckeyes, the leading offense in the Big Ten with an average of 335 yards per game, to 168 yards of total offense. Michigan totaled 218 yards. After the game, Michigan coach Bump Elliott said: "We played good football, but we didn't get the big play. It was a shame to lose after playing so well." Ohio State coach Woody Hayes also praised Michigan's defense: "Michigan was the hardest-hitting defensive team we played all year."

Award season
No Michigan players were named to the 1960 All-America team. Team captain and center Gerald Smith received second-team honors from the Associated Press and United Press International on the 1960 All-Big Ten Conference football team. 

At the school's annual football "bust" on November 28, senior halfback Dennis Fitzgerald received the team's most valuable player award.

Personnel

Players

The following 38 players received varsity letters for their participation on the 1960 Michigan football team. Players who started at least four games are shown with their names in bold.

 Reid Bushong, 6'1", 185 pounds, senior Toledo, OH – started 1 game at left halfback
 Keith E. Cowan – end
 Guy Curtis – tackle
 Guy J. DeStefano – fullback
 Dennis Fitzgerald, 5'10", 185 pounds, senior, Ann Arbor, MI – started 2 games at right halfback
 Bill Freehan, 6'3", 195 pounds, end, Royal Oak, MI – started 2 games at left end
 Dave Glinka, 6'1", 198 pounds, quarterback, Toledo, OH – started 3 games at quarterback
 Todd Grant – center
 Lee Hall, 6'0", 208 pounds, junior, Charlotte, MI – started 2 games at left guard
 John Halsted, 6'2", 208 pounds, senior, Bay City, MI – started 1 game at left end
 Donald Hannah – quarterback
 Willard R. Hildebrand – tackle
 John Houtman – center
 Thomas Jobson, 6'0", 215 pounds, senior, Flint, MI – started 9 games at left tackle
 Robert Johnson, 6'2", 201 pounds, senior, Chicago – started 9 games at right end
 Thomas Kerr – center
 Scott Maentz, 6'3", 206 pounds, junior, East Grand Rapids, MI – started 6 games at left end
 George Mans – tackle
 Gary McNitt, 5'10", 191 pounds, senior, Mesick, MI – started 4 games at right halfback
 Bennie McRae, 6'0", 170 pounds, junior, Newport News, VA – started 8 games at left halfback	
 John Minko – guard
 Joe O'Donnell – fullback
 David Palomaki – tackle
 Paul Poulos, 5'11", 205 pounds, senior, Ambridge, PA – started 7 games at left guard
 J. Paul Raeder – halfback
 Dave Raimey, 5'10", 190 pounds, sophomore, Dayton, OH – started 3 games at right halfback
 Jon Schopf, 6'2", 228 pounds, junior, Grand Rapids, MI – started 9 games at right tackle
 Gerald Smith, 5'11", 190 pounds, senior, Detroit – started 9 games at center
 John Stamos, 6'1", 208 pounds, junior, Chicago – started 6 games at quarterback
 William R. Stine – tackle
 Jack Strobel – halfback
 Dick Syring, 6'0", 192 pounds, senior, Bay City, MI – started 9 games at right guard
 Bill Tunnicliff, 6'1", 210 pounds, junior, Ferndale, MI – started 1 game at fullback
 Ken Tureaud, 6'1", 198 pounds, junior, Detroit – started 7 games at fullback
 Rudd Van Dyne, 6'0", 198 pounds, senior, Sedalia, MO – started 1 game at fullback
 John C. Walker – center
 Grant W. Walls Jr. – tackle
 James A. Ward – halfback

Coaches and other staff

 Head coach: Bump Elliott
 Assistant coaches: 
 Don Dufek – freshman coach
 Henry Fonde – backfield coach
 Jack Fouts – interior line coach
 Robert Hollway – defensive and line coach
 Jack "Jocko" Nelson -–end coach
 Trainer: Jim Hunt
 Team doctor: A. W. Coxon
 Manager: Fred Nemancheck

Statistical leaders

Michigan's individual statistical leaders for the 1960 season include those listed below.

Rushing

Passing

Receiving

Scoring

Kickoff returns

Punt returns

References

Michigan
Michigan Wolverines football seasons
Michigan Wolverines football